Sham Tseng is a coastal area in Tsuen Wan District, Hong Kong, between Ting Kau and Tsing Lung Tau.

History
At the time of the 1911 census, the population of Sham Tseng was 72. The number of males was 32.

In 1982, the Government launched a new town project for the area. There were proposals for a massive housing scheme, where the population of the village, then estimated at 6,000, was set to increase dramatically to 50,000 people. There would be an additional 26,000 in public housing, Home Ownership Scheme flats, Government offices and other amenities constructed on 47 hectares of land.
 
Starting in the 1990s, more and more private housing estates were built in the area for its views of Tsing Ma Bridge over Ma Wan Channel. It is linked to many other parts of Hong Kong by buses and mini-buses.

Villages and housing estates
Sham Tseng's villages are overshadowed and towered by new private housing estates:
Villages
 Sham Tseng Village
 Sham Tseng East Village
 Sham Tseng Kau Tsuen
 Sham Tseng San Tsuen
 Sham Tseng West Village

Sham Tseng Resite Village is a recognized village under the New Territories Small House Policy.

Private housing estates
 Bellagio – built on the site of former San Miguel brewery
 Dragonette
 Golden Villa
 Lido Garden
 Ocean Pointe – built on the site of former Union Carbide depot
 Pink Villa
 Rhine Garden
 Rhine Terrace
 Sea Crest Villa
 Anglers Bay
Sham Tseng is also home to the Sham Tseng Light Housing project, a 45-unit temporary social housing project housed in a former textile factory building.

Education

There are three schools in Sham Tseng:

 Emmanuel Primary School
 Sham Tseng Catholic Primary School – formerly Chai Wan Kok Catholic Primary School is relocated from Tsuen Wan for 2009–2010 school year
 Parkview-Rhine Garden Pre-school

Sham Tseng is in Primary One Admission (POA) School Net 62, which includes schools in Tsuen Wan and areas nearby. The net includes multiple aided schools and one government school, Hoi Pa Street Government Primary School.

Commerce

Sham Tseng is home to baker Garden Company Limited and former home of San Miguel Brewery Hong Kong. The brewery operations began in the 1933 as Hong Kong Brewers and Distillers Ltd under JH Ruttonjee and was sold to San Miguel Corporation in 1948. The brewery operations and head office moved in 1996 to Yuen Long Industrial Estate. A private housing estate called Bellagio now occupies the site of the old brewery.

Union Carbide once had a storage depot in the area, but it has since moved.

Small family restaurants make the bulk of the employment in the area. Most area residents work outside of Sham Tseng.

Tourist attractions

To the north of Sham Tseng is an undeveloped hilly area. Tai Lam Country Park, a large park located northwest of Sham Tseng. There are nature trails along Butterfly River and Falls near Sham Tseng.

Numerous beaches are found at or near Sham Tseng from the waterways joining Ma Wan Channel and Rambler Channel, but most are so polluted and officially closed from swimming due to contamination from sewers and the Sham Tseng Nullah. As a consequence, residents are more inclined to swim in pools located at their residential complexes.

A list of beaches in Sham Tseng:
 Approach Beach
 Anglers' Beach )
 Casam Beach, in Ting Kau
 Dragon Bay, in Tsing Lung Tau. Privately owned
 Gemini Beaches
 Hoi Mei Wan Beach
 Lido Beach, in Ting Kau
 Ting Kau Beach, in Ting Kau

Sham Tseng Temporary Market is a local produce market under the Sham Tseng Bridge flyover.

There are two retail malls located below residential flats to meet local needs:
 Rhine Garden Shopping Centre
 Bellagio Mall

Food
Sham Tseng is famous for roasted goose and they can be found at various restaurants in the area:

 Nang Kee Roast Duck Restaurant
 Chan Kee Roasted Goose
 Yue Kee Roast Goose Restaurant
 Fu Kee Roast Goose and Duck Restaurant

Infrastructure

 Sham Tseng Treatment Works
 Sham Tseng Sewage Treatment Works
 Sham Tseng Substation – China Light and Power
 Sham Tseng Fire and Ambulance Depots – Hong Kong Fire Services
 Airport Core Programme Exhibition Centre – Hong Kong International Airport
 Ma Wan Marine Traffic Control Centre – Transport Department

Transport
 Kowloon Motor Bus, Long Win Bus and Citybus (Hong Kong) operates bus routes that stop in Sham Tseng:
 KMB 234C / 234D
 KMB 48P / 234A / 234B / 261B / 53 / 52X
 Citybus 962B / 962E / 962N
 LWB A38 
 Minibuses that stops in Sham Tseng:
 96/96M/302/308M
Taxis (red taxis serving Kowloon and Hong Kong Island and green taxis serving the New Territories)
 Sham Tseng Link – a proposed bridge and highway linking Sham Tseng and Lantau Island; with connections with Route 3
 Sham Tseng Ferry Pier – former ferry service to Ma Wan Town

Major roads in Sham Tseng include:

 Castle Peak Road
 Tuen Mun Road/Tsing Long Highway

Local roads include:

 Sham Hong Road
 Sham Tsz Street

References

External links

 Delineation of area of existing village Sham Tseng (Tsuen Wan) for election of resident representative (2019 to 2022)
 Hong Kong Food Escapade
 Sham Tseng on Google Map

 
Tsuen Wan District